Tunnsjøflyan is a lake in the municipality of Røyrvik (and a very small part of Namsskogan) in Trøndelag county, Norway.  The  lake drains out into the large lake Tunnsjøen to the east.

See also
 List of lakes in Norway
 Tunnsjødal Hydroelectric Power Station

References

Lakes of Trøndelag
Røyrvik
Namsskogan